Bezirk Voitsberg is a district of the state of Styria in Austria.

Municipalities
Since the 2015 Styria municipal structural reform, it consists of the following municipalities:

 Bärnbach
 Edelschrott
 Geistthal-Södingberg
 Hirschegg-Pack
 Kainach bei Voitsberg
 Köflach
 Krottendorf-Gaisfeld
 Ligist
 Maria Lankowitz
 Mooskirchen
 Rosental an der Kainach
 Sankt Martin am Wöllmißberg
 Söding-Sankt Johann
 Stallhofen
 Voitsberg

Municipalities before 2015
Suburbs, hamlets and other subdivisions of a municipality are indicated in small characters.
 Bärnbach
Hochtregist
 Edelschrott
Kreuzberg
 Gallmannsegg
Hadergasse
 Geistthal
Eggartsberg, Kleinalpe, Sonnleiten
 Gößnitz
Hochgößnitz, Niedergößnitz
 Graden
 Hirschegg
Hirschegg-Piber-Sonnseite, Hirschegg-Piber-Winkel, Hirschegg-Rein
 Kainach bei Voitsberg
Breitenbach, Oswaldgraben
 Köflach
Gradenberg, Piber, Pichling bei Köflach, Puchbach
 Kohlschwarz
Hemmerberg
 Krottendorf-Gaisfeld
Gasselberg, Gaisfeld, Kleingaisfeld, Krottendorf bei Ligist, Muggauberg
 Ligist
Dietenberg, Grabenwarth, Ligistberg, Ligist Markt, Oberwald, Steinberg, Unterwald
 Maria Lankowitz
Kemetberg, Kirchberg
 Modriach
 Mooskirchen
Bubendorf, Fluttendorf, Gießenberg, Kniezenberg, Neudorf bei Mooskirchen, Rauchegg, Rubmannsberg, Stögersdorf
 Pack
 Piberegg
Piberegg Rollsiedlung
 Rosental an der Kainach
 Salla
 Sankt Johann-Köppling
Hallersdorf, Hausdorf, Köppling, Moosing, Muggauberg, Neudorf bei Sankt Johann ob Hohenburg, Sankt Johann ob Hohenburg
 Sankt Martin am Wöllmißberg
Großwöllmiß, Kleinwöllmiß
 Söding
Großsöding, Kleinsöding, Pichling bei Mooskirchen
 Södingberg
 Stallhofen
Aichegg, Bernau in der Steiermark, Hausdorf, Kalchberg, Muggauberg, Raßberg
 Voitsberg

References

 
Districts of Styria